{{DISPLAYTITLE:C8H18O2}}
The molecular formula C8H18O2 (molar mass: 146.22 g/mol) may refer to:

 Di-tert-butyl peroxide
 2-Hexoxyethanol
 Etohexadiol, an ectoparasiticide
 Octanediols
 1,2-Octanediol
 1,8-Octanediol